The 1995–96 Deutsche Eishockey Liga season was the 2nd season of the Deutsche Eishockey Liga.

As a replacement for the Mad Dogs München, the SC Riessersee moved up from the 2nd Bundesliga. However, continuing the financial unrest in the German Ice Hockey, SC Riessersee, as well as ESG Sachsen Weißwasser and the EC Hannover had to leave the league. The Düsseldorfer EG won the German championship by becoming the second DEL champion.

The corporate sponsor, the Krombacher Brewery, continued their engagement, albeit now less prominently featured on the league logo. The sponsorship agreement ended after this season.

Regular season
In the main round the 18 teams played a home-and-away schedule and, in regional groups, a second single round. After this, the play-off round of the last sixteen in the mode best of seven took place . The semi-finals and final were played in the mode best of five. The hope to be able to avoid the troubles of the old Bundesliga by stricter financial controls did not materialise in the first season. EC Hedos München, the Bundesliga's last champion, now renamed Mad Dogs Munich, folded on 18 December 1994.

GP = Games played; OTL = Overtime Loss; GF:GA = Goals for and against
Color code:  = Playoffs,  = Season end

Playoffs
All playoff rounds were played in as a best-of-five series.

First round
The even the chances, and enable the worse-placed team two home-games, the games were played in a Home-Away-Away-Home-Home series. This led to the Frankfurt Lions having only 1 home game, despite being the better placed team.

OT = Overtime; SO = Shootout

Quarterfinals

OT = Overtime; SO = Shootout

Semifinals

OT = Overtime; SO = Shootout

Finals

OT = Overtime; SO = Shootout

With the last game, the Düsseldorfer EG became the second DEL Champion and German Champions for the 8th time in the club history.

References

DEL
Ger
Deutsche Eishockey Liga seasons